Zidoria Sport Aïn Témouchent is an Algerian football club located in Aïn Témouchent, Algeria. The club currently plays in the Ligue Nationale du Football Amateur.

References

Football clubs in Algeria
Sports clubs in Algeria